The 2020 Duquesne Dukes football team represented Duquesne University in the 2020–21 NCAA Division I FCS football season. They were led by 16th-year head coach Jerry Schmitt and played their home games at Arthur J. Rooney Athletic Field. They played as a member of the Northeast Conference.

Schedule

References

Duquesne
Duquesne Dukes football seasons
Duquesne Dukes football